Hägglunds Arena (formerly Swedbank Arena and Fjällräven Center) is an indoor sporting arena located in Örnsköldsvik, Sweden. The capacity of the arena is 7,115 for ice hockey games and 9,800 for concerts, and the arena was opened on 26 August 2006.

History
Ground was broken for the arena on 14 September 2004. The arena is located in downtown Örnsköldsvik, by the harbor, and is surrounded by water on three sides. It contains three spectator levels: one suite level, and two general seating levels. Other features include a restaurant and six bars. The atrium features a light display called Active Light Field, which makes the atrium change colors.

In November 2009, it was announced that Fjällräven acquired the naming rights, and from January 1, 2010 until August 31, 2021 the arena was called Fjällräven Center. The naming rights were then purchased by BAE Systems Hägglunds and the Swedish Bosch Rexroth subsidiary, who renamed the venue to Hägglunds Arena for a period of five or ten years, starting September 1, 2021.

Events
It replaced the older Kempehallen as the home arena of the Modo Hockey ice hockey team. The third Semi-Final of Melodifestivalen 2007 was hosted at the arena, as well as the first Semi-Final of Melodifestivalen 2010 and the fourth Semi-Final of Melodifestivalen 2014. The arena was also one of the candidates to host the Eurovision Song Contest 2016. Other notable music acts include Takida, Tomas Ledin, Alice Cooper, Thin Lizzy, Michael W. Smith and Kent. It also hosted the 2008 European Curling Championships. The arena will host the 2019 IIHF World U18 Championships.

Gallery

See also
List of indoor arenas in Sweden
List of indoor arenas in Nordic countries

References

External links

MoDo Hockey och Hägglunds Arena — Official site 
Hockeyarenas.net entry for Fjällräven Center

Indoor arenas in Sweden
Indoor ice hockey venues in Sweden
Ice hockey venues in Sweden
Sports venues completed in 2006
Modo Hockey
Buildings and structures in Västernorrland County
Sport in Örnsköldsvik
2006 establishments in Sweden